The murder of Canadian transgender rights activist Julie Berman (1967/68 – 22 December 2019) occurred in downtown Toronto. Berman was found in a home with severe head injuries on 22 December 2019; she was brought to a hospital and pronounced dead. Colin Harnack was charged with second-degree murder, and he was convicted in December 2022. The murder of Berman was cited as a prominent example of violence against trans people in Canada.

Berman was a hairdresser, prominent for trans-activism within the Toronto LGBTQ+ community, who had volunteered with the Toronto-based LGBTQ+ charity The 519 for three decades. Berman fought to raise awareness of anti-trans violence in Toronto and was involved with running Toronto's "Trans Day of Remembrance", which she had also spoken at. Upon her death, Berman was hailed as a "lovely person who was committed to the political issues that are facing her community in Canada", a "champion for trans rights". Finance minister Bill Morneau, Toronto mayor John Tory, and Pride Toronto released statements mourning the death of Berman. A vigil was held for her death in February 2020.

References 

Place of birth missing
2019 murders in Canada
Violence against trans women
LGBT history in Canada
2019 in Ontario
2010s in Toronto
LGBT in Ontario
Transgender rights activists